Astrebla elymoides, commonly known as hoop Mitchell grass, is a herb of the family Poaceae. Named in honour of Thomas Mitchell, it is regarded as the best of the Astrebla grasses for grazing, particularly for cattle.  Often seen growing to one metre tall, on floodplains and heavy self mulching clay soils in arid to semi arid Australia. Flowering is in response to rain or flooding.

References

Chloridoideae
Flora of Australia
Plants described in 1879